Clarence Todd (1892–1973) was an Australian tennis player. A farmer by profession, he was born in Trundle, in rural New South Wales, in 1892.  Todd was a good volleyer and he always tried to get to the net as soon as he could in rallies. Todd reached the semi finals of the 1915 Australasian Championships (losing to Horace Rice). He also won the men's doubles with Rice. From 1916-17 Todd served during World War 1 and was badly injured in the leg when advancing against machine gun fire at the battle of Messines. He lost his first match at 1919 Australasian Championships to Allan North. In 1921 Todd lost in round two of the U. S. Championships to Willis Davis. He played Davis Cup in 1921.  He later moved to Queensland.

Grand Slam finals

Doubles: 1 title

References

1892 births
1973 deaths
Australian male tennis players
Australasian Championships (tennis) champions
Tennis people from New South Wales
Grand Slam (tennis) champions in men's doubles